The capped white-eye (Zosterops fuscicapilla) is a species of bird in the family Zosteropidae. It is found in New Guinea. Its natural habitat is in subtropical or tropical moist montane forests. It has a white eye ring, round wings, and strong legs. The capped white-eyes are sociable and live in large flocks. The Oya Tabu white-eye (Z. crookshanki) of the D'Entrecasteaux Islands was formerly considered a subspecies, but is now thought to be a distinct species.

References

External links
Entry at ZipcodeZoo.com

capped white-eye
Birds of New Guinea
capped white-eye
Taxonomy articles created by Polbot